"By Your Side" is a song by American rapper and singer Rod Wave. It was released on YouTube on November 14, 2021, before being uploaded to other platforms on November 22. It is the lead single to Wave's fourth studio album Beautiful Mind (2022). The song sees Rod Wave open a new chapter in life, while reflecting on life after the nine months since he released his third album, SoulFly. The chorus interpolates the Plain White T's' "Hey There Delilah" (2006).

Background and composition
In March 2021, Rod Wave released his second album, SoulFly, which has a track called "Gone Till November", on which he promises: "So I, I'll be gone 'til November, go in and mark your calendar". He fulfilled that promise by releasing "By Your Side" onto YouTube on November 14, and on other digital platforms on November 22. He opens the song by acknowledging that promise. Furthermore, the song contains pitched up vocals and "trunk-rattling" 808s, as Rod reflects on all the success he has achieved in the last year and his progession in the music industry, while also accepting his past. The song contains only one verse, and towards the end of it, Rod references his 2019 track "Cuban Links", on which he raps that he will die wearing Cuban Link jewelry; on "By Your Side" though, he dismisses that notion, as he now prefers luxury brand Richard Mille, and has found a renewed interest in life ("I got inside my bag and got out my feelings"). In the chorus, Rod directly interpolates the first verse from Plain White T's's 2006 single "Hey There Delilah", except he changes "Hey there Delilah" to "Hey there everybody". Genius' Ken Partridge opined that "By Your Side' isn't a love letter to one person; it's a song for anyone who's stuck in their feelings and would like a little company".

Music video
The music video accompanied the song's release and shows behind-the-scenes footage of Rod Wave's SoulFly tour.

Charts

Weekly charts

Year-end charts

Release history

References

2021 singles
2021 songs
Rod Wave songs
Sony Music singles
Songs written by Rod Wave